Digital keys that operate over NFC and/or UWB are compatible with a variety of mobile wallets. These digital keys can be stored in smart devices through the use of mobile wallets that have access to the device's embedded secure element, such as Google Wallet and Samsung Wallet for Android, Huawei Wallet for HarmonyOS, or Apple Wallet for iOS and watchOS.

The following is a list of digital keys and for what mobile wallets they are available.

Vehicles 

The digital key specification for vehicles is maintained by the Car Connectivity Consortium. As of 2022, most implementations of the technology follow the Digital Key 2.0 standard. The first automobile to follow the Digital Key 3.0 standard was the BMW iX.

Keys that are compatible with Google Wallet, Samsung Wallet, and Apple Wallet can be shared across platforms.

* = Keys in Samsung Wallet can vary in compatibility by car manufacturer. BMW vehicles require Galaxy Note20 series, Galaxy S21 series (including S21 FE) or later, Galaxy Z Flip4 or later, or Galaxy Z Fold4 or later. While Hyundai/Kia/Genesis vehicles allows for older devices as well, such as Galaxy S20 series (excluding S20 FE), Galaxy Z Flip to Galaxy Z Flip3, and Galaxy Z Fold2 to Galaxy Z Fold3.

Locks

Other

References 

Near-field communication